Norman Dunham (9 December 1925 – June 2005) was an English cricketer. He was a right-handed batsman and a right-arm medium-pace bowler who played for Leicestershire. He was born in Quorn and died in Leicester.

Dunham made a single first-class appearance for the side, against Hampshire in 1949. Batting in the tailend, he scored 3 runs in the first innings and 12 not out in the second.

External links
Norman Dunham at Cricket Archive 

1925 births
2005 deaths
English cricketers
Leicestershire cricketers
People from Quorn, Leicestershire
Cricketers from Leicestershire